is a passenger railway station located in Saiwai-ku, Kawasaki, Japan, operated by East Japan Railway Company (JR East).

Lines
Shin-Kawasaki Station is served by the Yokosuka Line and Shōnan-Shinjuku Line, and is located 12.7 km from Shinagawa Station and 19.5 km from Tokyo Station.

Station layout
The station consists of a single island platform serving two tracks. The platforms are capable of handling 15-car trains. The station is located adjacent to JR Freight's Shin-Tsurumi locomotive depot. The station is located on the former Hinkaku freight spur line of the Tōkaidō Main Line, but is not on the Tōkaidō Main Line itself, nor do trains from the Tōkaidō Main Line pass through the station. The station has a Midori no Madoguchi staffed ticket office.

Platforms

History
Shin-Kawasaki Station opened on 1 October 1980 as a commuter station for people living in the surrounding large residential areas working in Tokyo or Yokohama.

Passenger statistics
In fiscal 2019, the station was used by an average of 30,255 passengers daily (boarding passengers only).

The passenger figures (boarding passengers only) for previous years are as shown below.

Surrounding area
 Keio University Shinkawasaki Town Campus
 Yumemigasaki Zoological Park
 Mitsubishi Fuso Truck and Bus Technical Center
Kashimada Station on the Nambu Line lies approximately 400 meters to the east.

See also
List of railway stations in Japan

References

External links

 JR East station information 

Railway stations in Kanagawa Prefecture
Railway stations in Japan opened in 1980
Yokosuka Line
Railway stations in Kawasaki, Kanagawa